David McDowell Brown (April 16, 1956 – February 1, 2003) was a United States Navy captain and a NASA astronaut. He died on his first spaceflight, when the Space Shuttle Columbia (STS-107) disintegrated during orbital reentry into the Earth's atmosphere. Brown became an astronaut in 1996 but had not served on a space mission before the  Columbia disaster. Brown was posthumously awarded the Congressional Space Medal of Honor.

Education
 Attended McKinley Elementary, Arlington, Virginia
 Attended Swanson Middle, Arlington, Virginia
 1974: Graduated from Yorktown High School, Arlington, Virginia
 1978: Received bachelor of science degree in biology from the College of William and Mary
 1982: Received a doctorate in medicine from Eastern Virginia Medical School

Organizations
 Active in the Boy Scouts of America where he achieved its second-highest rank, Life Scout.
 Past President, International Association of Military Flight Surgeon Pilots
 Associate Fellow, Aerospace Medical Association
 Society of U.S. Naval Flight Surgeons.

Awards and honors
Brown, the 1986 recipient of the Navy Operational Flight Surgeon of the Year award, received numerous decorations including:

Qualification insignia
Naval Aviator
Naval Astronaut
Naval Flight Surgeon

Personal decorations
Defense Distinguished Service Medal †
Meritorious Service Medal
Navy and Marine Corps Achievement Medal
National Defense Service Medal
Congressional Space Medal of Honor †
NASA Distinguished Service Medal †
NASA Space Flight Medal †

The † symbol indicates a posthumous award.

Military career
Brown joined the U.S. Navy after his internship at the Medical University of South Carolina. Upon completion of flight surgeon training in 1984, he reported to the Navy Branch Hospital in Adak, Alaska, as Director of Medical Services. He was then assigned to Carrier Air Wing Fifteen which deployed aboard the aircraft carrier  in the Western Pacific. In 1988, he became the only flight surgeon in a ten-year period to be chosen for pilot training. He was ultimately designated a Naval Aviator in 1990 at NAS Chase Field in Beeville, Texas, ranking number one in his class. Brown was then sent for training and carrier qualification in the A-6E Intruder. In 1991, he reported to the Naval Strike Warfare Center at NAS Fallon, Nevada, where he served as a Strike Leader Attack Training Syllabus Instructor and a Contingency Cell Planning Officer. Additionally, he was qualified in the F/A-18 Hornet and deployed from Japan in 1992 aboard  flying the A-6E with VA-115. In 1995, he reported to the U.S. Naval Test Pilot School at NAS Patuxent River, Maryland as their flight surgeon where he also flew the T-38 Talon.

Brown logged over 2,700 flight hours with 1,700 in high-performance military aircraft. He was qualified as the first pilot in NASA T-38 aircraft.

He held a Federal Communications Commission (FCC) issued Technician Class amateur radio license with the call sign KC5ZTC.

NASA career

Selected by NASA in April 1996, Brown reported to the Johnson Space Center in August 1996. He completed two years of training and evaluation and was qualified for flight assignment as a mission specialist. He was initially assigned to support payload development for the International Space Station, followed by the astronaut support team responsible for orbiter cockpit setup, crew strap-in, and landing recovery.

On April 21, 2001, Brown appeared on ESPN as an expert on g-force loading on the human body that led to the cancellation of the Firestone Firehawk 600 CART race.

Brown flew aboard Space Shuttle Columbia on STS-107, logging 15 days, 22 hours, and 20 minutes in space from January 16 to February 1, 2003. The flight was a dedicated science and research mission. Working 24 hours a day, in two alternating shifts, the crew successfully conducted approximately 80 experiments. The mission ended abruptly on February 1, 2003, when Columbia's crew perished during entry, 16 minutes before the scheduled landing.

Personal life
As the lone unmarried member of the STS-107 crew, Brown had previously been romantically involved with NASA engineer Ann Micklos. The two ended their relationship shortly before the mission but remained close friends until his death. The crew of STS-107 had also formed a very close friendship in their training, that Brown had been preparing a videotape to commemorate once they returned from their mission.  Brown is buried in Arlington National Cemetery.

Tributes

 Asteroid 51825 Davidbrown was named in honor of Brown.
 Lunar crater D. Brown is named after Brown.
 Brown Hall, in the Columbia Village apartments, at the Florida Institute of Technology is named after him.
 He is the first person ever to be posthumously awarded the William & Mary Alumni Association's, Alumni Medal.
 The Laurel B. Clark and David M. Brown Aerospace Medicine Academic Center, located at the Naval Aerospace Medical Institute, is named after him.
 The Captain David Brown Aerospace and Medical Research Endowment was established in his memory to help deserving students attending Eastern Virginia Medical School.
 The planetarium of Arlington Public Schools was renamed the David M. Brown Planetarium.
 The Dave Brown Memorial Park in Friendswood, Texas, is named after him.
 The annual Astronaut Dave Brown Memorial gymnastics meet is held at the College of William & Mary in his honor, where Dave Brown was a gymnast.
 Yorktown High School Crew Team Men's Varsity 8 boat name Captain David M. Brown - c. 2003
 Circle Oil Hill Elementary of Circle USD 375 in Kansas grants a scholarship each year - David Brown Hopes & Dreams Scholarship. This scholarship was first awarded in 2005.

See also

Space science
Space Shuttle Columbia disaster

References

External links

David Brown STS-107 Crew Memorial
Captain David Brown Aerospace and Medical Research Endowment
Florida Today — Florida Tech dedicates dorms to Columbia 7 — October 29, 2003

1956 births
2003 deaths
Space Shuttle Columbia disaster
Physician astronauts
United States Navy astronauts
People from Arlington County, Virginia
Yorktown High School (Virginia) alumni
College of William & Mary alumni
Eastern Virginia Medical School alumni
American test pilots
Aviators from Virginia
Aviators killed in aviation accidents or incidents in the United States
Accidental deaths in Texas
Recipients of the Congressional Space Medal of Honor
Recipients of the NASA Distinguished Service Medal
Recipients of the Defense Distinguished Service Medal
Amateur radio people
Burials at Arlington National Cemetery
Space Shuttle program astronauts
United States Naval Aviators
United States Navy captains
United States Navy Medical Corps officers
United States Naval Test Pilot School alumni